Hormuz-1 (Persian: موشک هرمز-۱) is an Iranian anti-radar ballistic missile which has the capability of destroying radars on aircraft carriers, Patriot missile sites on land, and "search radar sites", according to Hajizadeh, commander of the Air Force of the Islamic Revolutionary Guard Corps).

Hormuz-1 has been made by Armed Forces of the Islamic Republic of Iran (designed by Hassan Tehrani Moghaddam), and is capable of annihilating a 20-foot container from a distance of 300 kilometers.

According to the commander of the Revolutionary Guards Air Force and also based on its similarity to the Khalije-Fars and Fateh-110 missiles, it is estimated that the range of the Hormuz-1 is 300 kilometers, and its speed is 4 to 5 mach. The Hormuz-1 is capable of carrying a warhead weight of about 600 kilograms. It mainly targets moving targets at sea.

See also 
 Hormuz-2 (missile)
 Fateh-110
 List of military equipment manufactured in Iran
 Science and technology in Iran

References 

Anti-radiation missiles of Iran
Ballistic missiles of Iran
Surface-to-surface missiles of Iran